Free birth may refer to:
Unassisted childbirth
Freedom of wombs, laws automatically freeing children of slaves at birth